The Pamelia Formation is a geologic formation in Ontario. It preserves fossils dating back to the Ordovician period.

See also

 List of fossiliferous stratigraphic units in Ontario

References
 

Ordovician Ontario
Ordovician southern paleotemperate deposits